Alfred Walker may refer to:

 Alfred Walker (cricketer) (1827–1870), English cricketer
 Alfred Walker (fencer) (1901–1983), American Olympic fencer
 Alfred Walker (rugby union) (c. 1893–1958), Australian rugby union player
 Alf Walker (1887–1961), English footballer